Jianzhou Ba Yin Ziyi Bianlan, variously translated as Jianzhou Eight-Yin Characters Meaning Handbook or The brief guide of eight tones and literal meaning in Jian Zhou, and often known by its shortened name Jianzhou Ba Yin, is a rime dictionary that records character pronunciations in Northern Min during the late Qing dynasty. It was compiled by Lin Duancai from Fuqing in 1795, modelling it after the Fuzhounese rime dictionary Qi Lin Bayin.

Notes

References

See also 
 Jian'ou dialect
 Qi Lin Bayin

External links 
 Full text of Jianzhou Ba Yin

Traditional Chinese phonology
Northern Min
Chinese dictionaries